Thirty One is the second studio album by American actress and country music singer Jana Kramer. It was released on October 9, 2015. It became available for preorder on August 27, 2015 on iTunes, the same day the track list was revealed.

Background
On the album's title, Kramer explained, "I want this title to be strong; I want this title to be me. I want this title to somehow portray the woman that I am. There's no other way of saying that than 'Thirty One.'"

Critical reception
Giving it a "B", Bob Paxman of Nash Country Weekly thought that "The songs here are mostly good, but it's hard to discern a real identity from the album as a whole." He thought that the first two singles, plus "Boomerang" and "Said No One Ever", were the strongest cuts.

Commercial performance
The album debuted at No. 3 on Top Country Albums, and No. 10 on the Billboard 200, with 18,000 copies sold in the US in the first week. It sold a further 5,000 copies in its second week.  The album has sold 79,000 copies in the US as of October 2016.

Track listing

Personnel

 Brent Anderson – banjo, acoustic guitar, mandolin
 Jeff Balding – engineer
 Drew Bollman – production assistant
 Matt Coles – assistant engineer
 Shannon Forrest – drums, percussion
 Paul Franklin – steel guitar, Dobro
 Catt Gravitt – background vocals
 Scott Hendricks – digital editing, editing, engineering, production
 Carolyn Dawn Johnson – engineering, background vocals
 Scott Johnson – production assistant
 Charlie Judge – Hammond B-3 organ, piano, synthesizer
 Jana Kramer – lead vocals, acoustic guitar
 Troy Lancaster – electric guitar
 Jerry McPherson – electric guitar
 Andrew Mendelson – mastering
 Gordon Mote – Hammond B3, piano
 Justin Niebank – mixing
 Katherine Petillo – art direction, design
 Ben Simonetti  – assistant engineer
 Jimmie Lee Sloas – bass guitar
 Bryan Sutton – acoustic guitar
 Shane Tarleton – creative director
 Steven Tyler – duet vocals on "Bullet"
 Derek Wells – electric guitar
 Brian David Willis – digital editing
 Nir Z. – drums, percussion

Charts

Weekly charts

Year-end charts

Singles

References 

2015 albums
Jana Kramer albums
Warner Records albums
Albums produced by Scott Hendricks